Frear is a surname. Notable people with the surname include:

Alexander Frear (1820–1882), American politician
Bryan Frear (1933–1997), English professional footballer
Caz Frear, British novelist
Elliott Frear (born 1990), footballer who is currently playing for Conference Premier side Forest Green Rovers
James A. Frear (1861–1939), U.S. Representative from Wisconsin
J. Allen Frear Jr. (1903–1993), American businessman and politician
Joseph Frear (builder) (1846–1926), New Zealand builder and businessman
Mary Dillingham Frear (1870–1951), First Lady of the Territory of Hawaii
Scott Frear, American football coach in the United States and Finland
Walter F. Frear (1863–1948), lawyer and judge in the Kingdom of Hawaii and Republic of Hawaii

See also
Frear Park, urban park in the city of Troy, New York
Freer (disambiguation)